Women's 10 metre air pistol was one of the thirteen shooting events at the 1992 Summer Olympics. It was the first Olympic competition after the introduction of the new target in 1989, and thus two Olympic records were set. The defending champion, Jasna Šekarić, established the first when taking a two-point pre-final lead ahead of Marina Logvinenko. In the final, Logvinenko eliminated the gap and finished on exactly the same score as Šekarić, winning the gold medal by virtue of a higher final score.

Qualification round

OR Olympic record – Q Qualified for final

Final

OR Olympic record

References

Sources

Shooting at the 1992 Summer Olympics
Olymp
Shoo